The 2022–23 season is Manchester United Women's fifth season since they were founded and their fourth in the Women's Super League, the professional top-flight women's league in England. The club will also compete in the FA Cup and League Cup.

For the third successive season, Manchester United Women scheduled a game at Old Trafford, this time on 3 December 2022 against Aston Villa. A second game at Old Trafford was also scheduled for the first time against West Ham United on 25 March 2023.

Pre-season and friendlies 
Having had an earlier friendly against Championship side Blackburn Rovers cancelled, Manchester United began pre-season with a behind-closed-doors friendly against fellow WSL club Liverpool at Carrington on 13 August. Leah Galton scored the only goal of a 1–0 win. United then travelled to France to take part in the invitational Women's French Cup held in Toulouse. They were drawn against Paris Saint-Germain in the semi-finals, winning 1–0 thanks to a Katie Zelem goal to set up a final against Bayern Munich who beat Barcelona on the other side of the draw. Bayern won 3–0. On August 28, United returned to Carrington to end pre-season with a 1–0 win over WSL side Everton. All but the match against Liverpool were broadcast live on MUTV. On the final weekend before the start of the season, United scheduled a game against Championship side Birmingham City. It was set to feature a depleted squad during the international break but it was later called off. In January, the team scheduled a mid-season week-long winter training camp in Malta including a friendly match against Birkirkara. The game was watched in front of 1,053 spectators, setting a new record attendance for a women's football match in Malta, beating the previous record of 764 set in 2019 by the national team.

Women's Super League

Matches

Table

Women's FA Cup 

As a member of the first tier, United entered the FA Cup in the fourth round proper.

FA Women's League Cup

Group stage 
As a team not qualified for the group stage of the Champions League, Manchester United entered the League Cup at the group stage.

Group A

Ranking of second-placed teams

Squad statistics 

Numbers in brackets denote appearances as substitute.
Key to positions: GK – Goalkeeper; DF – Defender; MF – Midfielder; FW – Forward

Transfers

In

Out

Loans in

Loans out

Notes

References

External links 
  

Manchester United W.F.C. seasons
Manchester United